Siwinqani (Aymara siwinqa a kind of cactus, -ni a suffix, "the one with the siwinqa plant", also spelled Sevencani) is a mountain in the Bolivian Andes which reaches a height of approximately . It is located at the border of the Chuquisaca Department, Oropeza Province, Poroma Municipality, and the Potosí Department, Chayanta Province, Ravelo Municipality.

References 

Mountains of Chuquisaca Department
Mountains of Potosí Department